Brishtamak (Bereştamaq) is a rural locality (a selo) in Assinsky Selsoviet, Beloretsky District, Bashkortostan, Russia. The population was 283 as of 2010. There are 3 streets.

Geography 
Brishtamak is located 119 km northwest of Beloretsk (the district's administrative centre) by road. Brish is the nearest rural locality.

References 

Rural localities in Beloretsky District